Richard Cook or Cooke may refer to:

Artists
 Richard Cook (artist 1784–1857), English artist
 Richard Cook (journalist) (1957–2007), British jazz writer, magazine editor and former record company executive
 Richard Cook (painter born 1947), British painter
 Richard B. Cook (1838–1916), British author

Politicians
 Richard Cecil Cook (1902–1977), Australian judge
 Richard Cook, chairperson of the Unionist funding organisation Constitutional Research Council
 Richard Cook, candidate in the 2010 US House of Representatives elections in Mississippi fot Dictrict 2
 Richard Cook, member of parliament for Coventry
 Richard Cooke (MP for Lymington) (1561–1616), English-born politician
 Richard Cooke (MP for Preston) (died 1579), English politician

Other
 Dick Cook (Richard W. Cook), American film entertainment executive
 Richard Cook (safety researcher) (1953–2022), system safety researcher
 Richard E. Cook (born 1930), former general authority of the Church of Jesus Christ of Latter-day Saints
 Richard G. Cooke (1946-2023), English archaeologist
 Richard J. Cook, American educator
 Richard Joseph Cooke (1853–1931), bishop of the Methodist Episcopal Church, South
 Richard M. Cook, American academic
 Richard W. Cook (1907–1992), American engineer
 Richard Cooke (footballer) (born 1965), English former footballer
 Rick Cook (architect) (born 1960), New York City architect

See also
 Cook (surname), an occupational surname of English origin
 Dick Cooke, former American college baseball coach
 Rick Cook (writer) (James Richard Cook; 1944–2022), American author